The Nihoa trapdoor spider or Nihoa mahina is a trapdoor spider endemic to Nihoa, Hawaii. These spiders are hunters that dig a hole near rocks cover it with a concealed trapdoor. These burrows are excavated completely with the spider's jaw. When prey approaches or falls in, the spider pounces on it. Then its abnormally large pedipalps are used to take food into the mouth.

Prior to the 1980s, trapdoor spiders were not thought to exist in Hawaii. Upon their discovery, the genus was given the name Nihoa, because it was thought to exist nowhere else. Eventually, over 23 species across the Pacific were found. The species epithet, "mahina", means "moon" in the Hawaiian language, referring how Sheila Conant discovered the spider by the light of the moon.

References
Rauzon, Mark J. (2001). Isles of Refuge: Wildlife and History of the Northwestern Hawaiian Islands. Honolulu, HI: University of Hawaii Press. .

Barychelidae
Endemic fauna of Nihoa
Spiders of Hawaii